The American School of Palestine is a K-12 bilingual (English and Arabic) school in al-Bireh and Ramallah, West Bank, Palestine.

History
Founded as the al-Jenan school in 1995, the school originally served mainly Palestinian youth returning to the area from North America.
School is now an elite private school in Al-Balou between al-Bireh and Ramallah, sitting next to the Plaza Mall. Its high school and middle school students are prepped for the SAT test later being taken in 11th and 12th grade.

References

External links

 School Website

American international schools in Asia
Educational institutions established in 1995
Schools in the West Bank
High schools in the State of Palestine
International schools in the State of Palestine
1995 establishments in the Palestinian territories
Buildings and structures in Al-Bireh
Primary schools in the State of Palestine